Lucy Montgomery may refer to:

Lucy Montgomery (actress) (born 1975), British television actress
Lucy Maud Montgomery (1874–1942), Canadian author
Lucy Montgomery (As the World Turns), a fictional character in As the World Turns